Major Leslie James Hiddins AM (born 13 August 1946 in Brisbane, Queensland), known as "The Bush Tucker Man" is a retired Australian Army soldier and war veteran who is best known for his love and knowledge of the Australian bush. Hiddins is recognized by his distinctively modified Akubra hat and big cheesy grin.

Military service

As a soldier with the Australian Army, Hiddins did two deployments in South Vietnam between 1966 and 1968, the first as a forward scout in the infantry. In 1980, he was awarded a Defence Fellowship to research survival in northern Australia. He was the principal author of the Australian Army's military survival manual (1987).

As part of this research, Hiddins was introduced to the Kakadu plum (Terminalia ferdinandiana) by the Aboriginal people, who had used the plant for thousands of years. He claims that the analysis finding it to have the highest concentration of Vitamin C of any known natural substance in the world was made on fruit he provided.

Hiddins retired from the Australian Regular Army (ARA) in 1989 with the rank of Major but continued to serve with the Army Reserve (ARES) until 2001, working with Indigenous Australian communities in northern Australia.

Bush Tucker Man
This research turned into the TV series The Bush Tucker Man. The series involves Hiddins driving around in a Land Rover Perentie, in later episodes a white non-Army custom Land Rover Perentie (commonly confused with a Land Rover County)  with his trademark hat, finding and describing native Australian bush food or "bush tucker". Hiddins appeared in two ABC TV series of Bush Tucker Man, and the series Bush Tucker Man – Stories of Survival. He also appeared in the TV documentaries Pandora – in the Wake of the Bounty and The Batavia. His other publications are Bush Tucker Man – Stories of Exploration and Survival (1996), Bush Tucker Man – Tarnished Heroes (1997), Explore Wild Australia with the Bush Tucker Man (1999), Bush Tucker Fieldguide (2002). In 2000 Hiddins published four books specifically for children: The Coral Coast, The Top End, The Tropical Rainforest, and The Living Desert. He has released two CD-ROMs, From the Rainforest to Cape York Peninsula and From Arnhem Land to the Kimberley Ranges. The National Museum of Australia in Canberra has a Bush Tucker Man display with some of his original bush gear.
 
In 2001, Hiddins led an effort to establish a wilderness retreat, exclusively for war veterans, on a 9 km2 parcel of government land along the banks of the Normanby River at "Kalpowar Station", adjoining Rinyirru National Park in Cape York Peninsula.  The remote and relatively inaccessible area, devoid of amenities of any kind, was named "Pandanus Park".  After years of conflict with government over their illegal occupation, the group secured a 15-year lease when the entire Kalpowar Station was returned to Aboriginal title in 2005.

Ray Mears made a BBC programme about and with him, shown on BBC Two in June 2009 as part of his Ray Mears Goes Walkabout series.

Awards and honours
In 1987, Hiddins was appointed a Member of the Order of Australia.

On 28 March 2008, Hiddins was awarded an Honorary Doctorate of Science by James Cook University's Faculty of Science, Engineering and Information Technology:

TV programmes 

Series:
Bush Tucker Man, Series One (1988 – 8 episodes, released on DVD in 2004) – ABC
Episode 1: Arnhem Land (Aborigines of Ngukurr, NT)
Episode 2: The Wet in Port Keats (Northwest Northern Territory in the Wet Season)
Episode 3: Desert (Desert Country)
Episode 4: Prince Regent Gorge (Heart of the Kimberley)
Episode 5: Rain Forest (Rainforest at Iron Range)
Episode 6: Coastal (Northern Queensland Coastline)
Episode 7: Doomadgee (Gulf Country)
Episode 8: Aurukun (West Coast of Cape York)

Bush Tucker Man, Series Two (1990 – 7 episodes, released on DVD 1 October 2009) – ABC
Episode 1: Wet Season
Episode 2: East To West
Episode 3: Kimberley
Episode 4: Top End
Episode 5: Wildman
Episode 6: Desert Story
Episode 7: Coastal Story

Bush Tucker Man – Stories of Survival (1996 – 8 episodes, released on DVD in 2004) – ABC
Episode 1: The Coffee Royal Affair
Episode 2: The Cannibal Convict
Episode 3: The Great Misadventure
Episode 4: The Best of Them All
Episode 5: The Dutch Settlement
Episode 6: Gold Fever
Episode 7: The Passionate Prussian
Episode 8: Into The Vilest Country

Books 
Bush Tucker Man Series
Bush Tucker Man – Stories of Exploration and Survival (1996)
Bush Tucker Man – Tarnished Heroes (1997)
Explore Wild Australia with the Bush Tucker Man (1999)
Bush Tucker Field Guide (2002)
Children's Books
The Coral Coast
The Top End
The Tropical Rainforest
The Living Desert

See also
 Malcolm Douglas
 Steve Irwin

External links
Bush tucker bibliography – links
Bush Tucker Man-8 Classic Stories Of Survival With Les Hiddins (1996)
Gone Bush: Bush Tucker Man Les Hiddins
Explore Australia Bush Tucker Books

References

Australian television presenters
Australian male television actors
Australian Army soldiers
Australian military personnel of the Vietnam War
Living people
Recipients of the Medal of the Order of Australia
1946 births
Survivalists